The 2021 ISSF World Cup is the annual edition of the ISSF World Cup in the Olympic shooting events, governed by the International Shooting Sport Federation.

In 2020, due to the COVID-19 pandemic, the only stage that went ahead as planned was the first stage of the shotgun world cup in Nicosia, Cyprus.

ISSF has renamed the year end ISSF World Cup Final to ISSF Champions Cup, the tournament will be conducted in Baku, Azerbaijan from 18 to 24 October.

The Baku leg of the World Cup for Rifle/Pistol/Shotgun was cancelled due to a surge in COVID-19 cases in the host country.

Men's results

Rifle events

Pistol events

Shotgun events

Team Results

Women's results

Rifle events

Pistol events

Shotgun events

Team Results

Mixed team results 

BMM - Bronze Medal Match

S-off - Shoot off

Medal table 
Combined Medal Tally after ISSF World Cup (Shotgun), Cairo, Egypt and ISSF World Cup (Rifle/ Pistol/Shotgun), New Delhi, India and ISSF World Cup (Shotgun), Lonato, Italy.

References 

ISSF World Cup
ISSF World Cup